The 5th Secretariat of the Communist Party of Vietnam (CPV), formally the 5th Secretariat of the Central Committee of the Communist Party of Vietnam (Vietnamese: Ban Bí thư Ban Chấp hành Trung ương Đảng Cộng sản Việt Nam Khoá V), was elected by the 1st Plenary Session of the 5th Central Committee (CC) in the immediate aftermath of the 5th National Congress.

Members

References

Bibliography
 

5th Secretariat of the Communist Party of Vietnam